The Molalla Pioneer is the local weekly newspaper in Molalla, Oregon, United States which began publishing in 1913. The Pioneer is currently a weekly newspaper published on Wednesdays. In January 2013, the paper was bought by Pamplin Media Group, which owns other local newspapers in Oregon such as The Newberg Graphic and The Canby Herald.

As of 2017, the paper's publisher is Sandy Storey.  John Baker took over as editor in July 2017; he has also served as editor of the Canby Herald for the last decade. In July 2017, Kristen Wohlers was hired as a reporter.

References

1913 establishments in Oregon
Molalla, Oregon
Newspapers published by Pamplin Media Group
Oregon Newspaper Publishers Association
Newspapers established in 1913